Margaret Aileen Carroll  ( O'Leary; June 1, 1944 – April 19, 2020) was a Canadian politician. She served as a member of the House of Commons from 1997 to 2006 who represented the ridings of Barrie—Simcoe—Bradford and Barrie. She served in the cabinet of Prime Minister Paul Martin as Minister for International Cooperation. From 2007 to 2011 she was a Liberal member of the Legislative Assembly of Ontario. She served in the cabinet of Premier Dalton McGuinty as Minister of Culture.

Education
Carroll had a Bachelor of Arts from Saint Mary's University (1965) and a Bachelor of Education from York University (1989). She was a partner in a small manufacturing and retail business.

Politics

Municipal
Carroll began her career in politics as a Barrie City councillor, representing the downtown Barrie ward.

Federal
In 1997, Carroll won the Liberal nomination for the newly created riding of Barrie—Simcoe—Bradford. She went on to win the 1997 election by 7,507 votes, and was re-elected again in 2000.  She was elected in 2004 in the newly created riding of Barrie.

Carroll served as Parliamentary Secretary of Foreign Affairs from 2001 to 2003.  Carroll was appointed as Minister for International Cooperation, responsible for the Canadian International Development Agency, when Paul Martin became Prime Minister on December 12, 2003.  She was the first, and to date only, federal cabinet minister from Barrie. She retained that portfolio until the Liberals were defeated in 2006, when she lost her seat to her 2004 challenger Patrick Brown.

Carroll was a supporter of Paul Martin's leadership bid leading up to the 2003 Liberal Party of Canada leadership election. Carroll supported Michael Ignatieff during the 2006 Liberal Party of Canada leadership election, serving as his Ontario campaign co-chair with former DFAIT cabinet colleague Jim Peterson.

Cabinet positions

Provincial
In 2007, she ran as the Liberal candidate in the provincial riding of Barrie for the 2007 provincial election and defeated incumbent MPP Joe Tascona. She was appointed to provincial cabinet of Premier Dalton McGuinty as Minister of Culture and as Minister Responsible for Seniors shortly after that election. She was relieved of her cabinet posts in January 2010. In 2011, she announced she would not run for re-election in the riding of Barrie.

After her term as an MPP, she continued her association with the Liberal party, serving as vice president to the Barrie riding association. In 2012, she supported Kathleen Wynne in the 2013 leadership election.

Personal life 
Carroll married D. Kevin Carroll  in 1968. He had served as the president of the Canadian Bar Association from 2009 to 2010. They had two grown children, Daniel and Joanna. She died on April 19, 2020, at the age of 75.

Electoral record

References

External links

  

1944 births
2020 deaths
Barrie city councillors
Women government ministers of Canada
Women members of the House of Commons of Canada
Liberal Party of Canada MPs
Members of the 27th Canadian Ministry
Members of the Executive Council of Ontario
Members of the House of Commons of Canada from Ontario
Members of the King's Privy Council for Canada
Ontario Liberal Party MPPs
People from Halifax, Nova Scotia
Saint Mary's University (Halifax) alumni
Women MPPs in Ontario
Women municipal councillors in Canada
York University alumni
21st-century Canadian women politicians